Frank Rolland Dessau (March 29, 1883 – May 6, 1952) was a pitcher in Major League Baseball. He pitched in two games for the 1907 Boston Doves and in nineteen games for the  1910 Brooklyn Superbas. He was also a manager in minor league baseball for the York White Roses, Decatur Commodores, and Springfield Senators over 11 seasons.

External links

1883 births
1952 deaths
Brooklyn Superbas players
Boston Doves players
Baseball players from Pennsylvania
Major League Baseball pitchers
Minor league baseball managers
Birmingham Barons players
Geneva Golden Tornadoes baseball players
Harrisburg Senators players
Lancaster Red Roses players
Waynesburg (minor league baseball) players
Williamsport Millionaires players
Steubenville Stubs players
Baltimore Orioles (IL) players
Rochester Bronchos players
Lincoln Railsplitters players
Atlanta Crackers players
Kansas City Blues (baseball) players
Lincoln Tigers players
Elmira Colonels players
Bridgeport Americans players
York White Roses players